József Nagy (2 October 1881, Sárkeresztúr – 1952) was a Hungarian athlete.  He competed at the 1908 Summer Olympics in London.

Nagy was a member of the Hungarian medley relay team that won a bronze medal. He was the third runner on the squad, running 400 metres.  He followed Pál Simon and Frigyes Wiesner and was followed by Ödön Bodor.

Nagy had a six-yard lead over the Swedish team in the first round, but was unable to hold on to it.  He made the transfer to Bodor while three yards behind.  Bodor was able to regain the lead in the second half of the race to keep the Hungarians in the competition.  In the final, Nagy was able to make the transfer to Bodor while five yards ahead of the German runners, though hopelessly behind the dominant American team.  This time it was Bodor who was passed, and the Hungarians finished third.

Nagy also competed in the 400, 800, and 1,500 metre races, but did not advance to the final in any of them.  He placed second, fourth, and second in his first round heats, respectively.

References

Sources
 
 
 

1881 births
Year of death missing
Sportspeople from Fejér County
Hungarian male sprinters
Athletes (track and field) at the 1908 Summer Olympics
Olympic athletes of Hungary
Olympic bronze medalists for Hungary
Medalists at the 1908 Summer Olympics
Olympic bronze medalists in athletics (track and field)